The 2014–15 Tercera División was the fourth tier of football in Spain.  Play started in August 2014 and ended in June 2015 with the promotion play-off finals.

Competition format
The top four eligible teams in each group, played in the promotion playoffs.
The champion of each group will qualify to 2015–16 Copa del Rey. If the champion is a reserve team, the first non-reserve team qualified will join the Copa.
In each group, at least three teams will be relegated to Regional Divisions.

League tables

Group I – Galicia

 Promoted from Preferente: Negreira (One year after), Galicia de Mugardos (First time ever), Barco (21 years after), Verín (5 years after) and Noia (First time ever).

Top goalscorers

Top goalkeeper

Group II – Asturias

 Promoted from Preferente: Siero (6 years after), Colunga (First time ever) and Tineo (First time ever).

Top goalscorers

Top goalkeeper

Group III – Cantabria

 Promoted from Preferente: Guarnizo (One year after), Sámano (26 years after) and Naval (12 years after).

Top goalscorers

Top goalkeeper

Group IV – Basque Country

 Promoted from Preferente and División de Honor: Vitoria (3 years after), Elgorriaga (First time ever), Deusto (30 years after), Getxo (2 years after), Aurrerá de Ondarroa (9 years after) and Aretxabaleta (5 years after).

Top goalscorers

Top goalkeeper

Group V – Catalonia

 Promoted from Primera Catalana: Júpiter (2 years after), Granollers (9 years after) and Morell (First time ever).

Top goalscorers

Top goalkeeper

Group VI – Valencian Community

 Promoted from Preferente: Buñol (11 years after), Recambios Colón (First time ever) and Rayo Ibense (28 years after).

Top goalscorers

Top goalkeeper

Group VII – Community of Madrid

 Promoted from Preferente: Aravaca (One year after), Collado Villalba (One year after), Colonia Moscardó (2 years after) and Lugo Fuenlabrada (First time ever).

Top goalscorer

Top goalkeeper

Group VIII – Castile and León

 Promoted from Primera Regional: Sporting Uxama (11 years after), Santa Marta (One year after) and Ciudad Rodrigo (33 years after).

Top goalscorers

Top goalkeeper

Group IX – Eastern Andalusia and Melilla

 Promoted from Primera Andaluza and Primera Melilla: Rincón (First time ever), Comarca del Mármol (First time ever) and River Melilla (First time ever).

Top goalscorers

Top goalkeeper

Group X – Western Andalusia and Ceuta

Top goalscorers

Top goalkeeper

Group XI – Balearic Islands

Top goalscorers

Top goalkeeper

Group XII – Canary Islands

Top goalscorers

Top goalkeeper

Group XIII – Region of Murcia

Top goalscorers

Top goalkeeper

Group XIV – Extremadura

Top goalscorers

Top goalkeeper

Group XV – Navarre

Top goalscorers

Top goalkeeper

Group XVI – La Rioja

Top goalscorers

Top goalkeeper

Group XVII – Aragon

Top goalscorers

Top goalkeeper

Group XVIII – Castilla-La Mancha

Top goalscorers

Top goalkeeper

References

 
Tercera División seasons
4
Spain